The Kegs is a historic drive-in located in Grand Forks, North Dakota.  The restaurant takes the form of two large wooden barrels.  The barrel structures were originally built in 1935 as part of a chain of seven walk-up root beer stands called The Barrel by William Harry Muzzy. In 1946 the current drive-in came into being when the barrels were moved to their current location and joined by the rectangular section housing the front counter.  The building was listed on the National Register of Historic Places in 2011.

References

Commercial buildings on the National Register of Historic Places in North Dakota
Commercial buildings completed in 1946
Novelty buildings in North Dakota
Root beer stands
Drive-in restaurants
Restaurants in North Dakota
Restaurants established in 1946
1946 establishments in North Dakota
National Register of Historic Places in Grand Forks, North Dakota
Restaurants on the National Register of Historic Places
Relocated buildings and structures in North Dakota